David Goodfriend (born 1968) is an American attorney and advocate in Washington, D.C. He is a former Clinton Administration aide, where he served as Deputy Staff Secretary to President William J. Clinton. Goodfriend's politics and government career also includes staff positions with Rep. Charles B. Rangel, Sen. Herb Kohl, and as legal advisor to Federal Communications Commissioner Susan Ness.

Goodfriend graduated summa cum laude from Beloit College in 1990.

Goodfriend is co-host of "Left Jab" on Sirius-XM Satellite Radio and is a politics contributor on MSNBC and CNBC.

Goodfriend was a co-founder and EVP/General Counsel of Air America Radio, and was Vice President of Law and Public Policy at DISH Network, EchoStar Satellite LLC (DISH Network).

Goodfriend is also the founder and chairman of Sports Fans Coalition, a coalition of sports activists, fighting to give sports fans greater voice in public policy impacting professional and collegiate sports.

References

External links
 Sports Fans Coalition Website

American activists
American lawyers
American political commentators
American radio personalities
Beloit College alumni
1968 births
Living people